Hillar Aarelaid (born 31 December 1967) is the founder and first CEO for Estonia's Computer Emergency Response Team (CERT-EE). He was the Director General of the Estonian Data Protection Inspectorate from 1999 to 2003.

Aarelaid was one of the central officials in charge of responding to the computer attacks on Estonia after the Bronze Soldier of Tallinn controversy. American expert Bill Woodcock and other observers praised Aarelaid's calm professionalism displayed during the attacks.

References

Living people
1967 births
Chief executives of computer security organizations
Recipients of the Order of the White Star, 5th Class
Estonian computer scientists